Portrush railway station is the terminus of the Coleraine-Portrush railway line and serves the seaside town of Portrush, County Antrim, Northern Ireland.

History

The station, which is 67¾ miles from Belfast, was opened on 4 December 1855. To accommodate excursion and holiday traffic, extensive reconstruction by the Belfast and Northern Counties Railway, under the direction of its engineer and architect Berkeley Deane Wise, was completed in 1893.  Three platforms were provided (only one is now in regular use) together with a train shed (demolished) and a station building in a "half-timbered" Mock Tudor style with a clock tower, described by Currie as "certainly one of the most handsome railway buildings in Ireland"; it is now occupied by a retail unit, with a small newer concrete block ticket office behind it serving as the current station building.  Goods traffic to the station closed on 20 September 1954.

The large 1892 grandfather clock from the station was returned to Portrush in 2007 and is displayed in Barry's Amusements complex adjacent to the station.  Other survivals from the past are some semaphore signals (of the "somersault" type) and an early water tank.

Formerly the railway owned the Northern Counties Hotel, the largest visitor accommodation in the town. The Giant's Causeway Tramway began in Eglinton Street alongside the station.

A single branch line was built from the station to Portrush harbour in 1866. It closed in 1949. Part of this line is now a pedestrian walkway; a footbridge has replaced the railway's former harbour bridge.

Modernisation 

In 2018, Graham Construction was appointed as the Principal Contractor to carry out development works to Portrush Station.  This formed part of a wider £17 million investment to regenerate Portrush town ahead of The Open golf championship.

The works involved demolition of the existing ticket office in order to replace it with a larger, station building complete with concourse waiting area, staff rooms and public toilets.  The platforms were extended to improve and increase commuter access.  New steel canopies have been installed to Platform 1 and to central Platforms 2 and 3.  The old masonry walls on Eglinton Street were replaced with newly constructed, stone-clad walls and artistic metalwork.  Works to the new station commenced in April 2018 and were completed in Spring/Summer 2019 in time for The Open in July 2019.

Service
Monday to Friday, first 2 trains from Portrush are through trains to Great Victoria street.  The rest of the day, an hourly service operates to Coleraine.

On Saturdays, the first train from Portrush is a through train to Great Victoria street.  The rest of the day, an hourly service operates to Coleraine.

On Sundays, there is an hourly service to Coleraine, with the service extending to Great Victoria street every two hours.

Monday to Sunday, all passengers for Castlerock, Bellarena and Londonderry must change at Coleraine.

Ulsterbus services connect Portrush to nearby Portstewart and Bushmills.

References

External links
 

1855 establishments in Ireland
Railway stations in County Antrim
Railway stations opened in 1855
Railway stations served by NI Railways
Railway station
Railway stations in Northern Ireland opened in the 19th century